The Good Earth is a Pulitzer Prize-winning novel by Pearl S. Buck.

The Good Earth may also refer to:

The Good Earth (film), the 1937 adaptation of the novel, starring Paul Muni and Luise Rainer
The Good Earth (Manfred Mann's Earth Band album), 1974
The Good Earth (The Feelies album), 1986
Good Earth Tea, a tea company based in Santa Cruz, California
Good Earth (restaurant chain), US health food franchise restaurant from the 1970s and 1980s